Grassy Creek is a  long 3rd order tributary to the Deep River in Moore County, North Carolina.

Course
Grassy Creek rises about 0.25 miles northeast of Westmoore School in Moore County and then flows east to join the Deep River about 3 miles west of High Falls, North Carolina.

Watershed
Grassy Creek drains  of area, receives about 47.6 in/year of precipitation, and has a wetness index of 423.32 and is about 54% forested.

See also
List of rivers of North Carolina

References

Rivers of North Carolina
Rivers of Moore County, North Carolina